Joseph Gillow (5 October 1850, Preston, Lancashire – 17 March 1921, Westholme, Hale, Cheshire) was an English Roman Catholic antiquary, historian and bio-bibliographer, "the Plutarch of the English Catholics".<ref>Thomas Bridgett, in The Catholic Who's Who and Yearbook, 1908; quoted in ODNB.</ref>

Biography
Born in Frenchwood House, Lancashire, to a recusant English Roman Catholic family able to trace an uninterrupted pedigree back to Conishead Priory in 1325, Gillow was the son of a magistrate, Joseph Gillow (1801-1872), and his wife, Jane Haydock (1805-1872), a descendant of Christopher Haydock, a Lancashire politician and a member of another prominent recusant English Roman Catholic family, the Haydocks of Cottam. 

Joseph Gillow was educated at Sedgley Park School, Wolverhampton (1862-1863) and St Cuthbert's College, Ushaw (1864-1866), where his brothers and uncles had studied for the priesthood. At Ushaw, Gillow developed an abiding interest in Lancashire Catholicism, resulting in the publication of The Tyldesley Diary in 1873.

In 1878 Gillow married Eleanor McKenna, daughter of John McKenna, of Dunham Massey Hall, with whom he had seven children. In marrying into the McKennas, Gillow secured himself a private income which allowed him to pursue his antiquarian interests.

Gillow published various researches into the history of Roman Catholicism in Lancashire, but his greatest achievement was A Literary and Biographical History, or Bibliographical Dictionary of the English Catholics : from the Breach with Rome, in 1534, to the Present Time (5 vols, 1885-1902), available in Google Books. To fit his material into the five volumes allotted him by his publishers, he needed to abbreviate the later volumes. 

Cardinal Gasquet described the dictionary as a ‘veritable storehouse of information’, however, until 1986, no index was available.

Gillow was appointed honorary recorder of the Catholic Record Society at its foundation in 1904, and was a frequent contributor.

Other works
 'Lord Burghley's Map of Lancashire', Miscellanea of the Catholic Record Society, 4 (London, 1907), pp. 162-216 and frontispiece
 The Tyldseley Diary (editor)
 The Haydock Papers St. Thomas Priory: the Story of a Staffordshire Mission Lancashire Recusants A Catalogue of the Martyrs in Englande for Profession of the Catholique Faith since the yeare of Our Lord 1535''

See also
 Paulyn Gillow
 Cardinal William Allen
 Richard Gillow
 Robert Gillow
 Brian Gillow
 Leighton Hall, Lancashire
 Eulogio Gillow y Zavalza
 Gillows of Lancaster and London

References

External links

 
 
 

1850 births
1921 deaths
English antiquarians
English Roman Catholics
English bibliographers
People from Hale, Greater Manchester
Writers from Preston, Lancashire
Alumni of Ushaw College
Clergy from Preston, Lancashire
19th-century English historians
20th-century English historians